Filiga Lio Falaniko (born Apia, 17 September 1970) is a Samoan former rugby union player and boxer. He plays as a lock.
Currently, he works as personal trainer.

Career
His international debut in 1991, against Tonga, at Apia, on 17 June 1990. Despite missing that year's World Cup through injury he was a regular for the Samoans throughout the 1990s, playing in both the 1995 and 1999 World Cups - scoring a memorable try against Wales in Samoa's 38-31 win at the then all-new Millennium Stadium in Cardiff.

Ranging lock Falaniko joined the Hurricanes for one season in 1999 from the Highlanders, where he had played 24 super 12 games between 1996-1998. Falaniko was used alongside Dion Waller, Mark Cooksley and Inoke Afeaki in the locking role for the Hurricanes, winning five caps, and making four starts against the Cats, Sharks, Blues, and finally his old team the Highlanders.

Vastly experienced at provincial level, Falaniko played a number of times for Otago, spent a season with Southland prior to his Super 12 stint in Wellington and also for North Harbour in 1999. Additionally Falaniko was an international volleyball representative and spent several years as a Les Mills Gyms fitness trainer. He took his personal trainer expertise to Perth, where he now resides and also coaches at club level.

Boxing career
Between 2005 and 2011, Falaniko undertook a boxing career, going undefeated in 10 heavyweight professional boxing bouts in New Zealand.

References

External links
Lio Falaniko International
Lio Falaniko at The Hurricanes

1970 births
Living people
Sportspeople from Apia
Samoan rugby union coaches
Samoan rugby union players
Samoan expatriate sportspeople in New Zealand
Rugby union locks
Samoan male boxers
Samoa international rugby union players
University of Auckland alumni
Expatriate rugby union players in New Zealand
Samoan expatriate rugby union players
Otago rugby union players
Southland rugby union players
North Harbour rugby union players
Highlanders (rugby union) players
Hurricanes (rugby union) players
Hanazono Kintetsu Liners players
Union Bordeaux Bègles players
Samoan expatriate sportspeople in Japan
Samoan expatriate sportspeople in France